Pionycha is a genus of beetles in the family Carabidae, containing the following species:

 Pionycha maculata (Gory, 1833)
 Pionycha pallens Lucas, 1857
 Pionycha tristis (Gory, 1833)

References

Ctenodactylinae